RIKEN cDNA 3110001I22 is a protein that in the house mouse is encoded by the 3110001I22Rik gene.

Model organisms	

			
Model organisms have been used in the study of 3110001I22Rik function. A conditional knockout mouse line, called 3110001I22Riktm1a(EUCOMM)Wtsi was generated as part of the International Knockout Mouse Consortium program — a high-throughput mutagenesis project to generate and distribute animal models of disease to interested scientists — at the Wellcome Trust Sanger Institute.

Male and female animals underwent a standardized phenotypic screen to determine the effects of deletion. Twenty two tests were carried out on mutant mice, but no significant abnormalities were observed.

References

Further reading 
 

Mouse proteins
Genes mutated in mice